HLA-DR8 (DR8) is a HLA-DR serotype that recognizes the DRB1*0801 to *0807, and *0810 to *0812 gene products.

Serology

The serological reaction of DR8 is relatively good. The serology of DRB1*0808, *0809 and *0813 to *0832 serotypes is unknown.

Disease associations
DR8 is linked to papillary thyroid carcinomas, early onset pauciarticular juvenile chronic arthritis, primary biliary cirrhosis

by allele
HLA-DRB1*0801 is linked to primary biliary cirrhosis In Mexicans DR8 is found more often in type-2 juvenile diabetes.

HLA-DRB1*0803 is also linked to primary biliary cirrhosis

Genetic Linkage

HLA-DR8 is not  genetically linked to HLA-DR51 to DR53, but is linked to DQ4 serotypes.

References

8